David is a 2013 Indian Hindi-language crime film directed by Bejoy Nambiar, starring Vikram, Neil Nitin Mukesh and Vinay Virmani in the title role, alongside Tabu, Monica Dogra, Lara Dutta and Isha Sharvani. The film was partially reshot in Tamil under the same title with Jiiva replacing Virmani. The plot revolves around the lives of three different men named David, who are about to take a step which is going to change their lives forever. Both the Hindi and Tamil versions were released on 1 February 2013.

Plot 
The London segment featuring Neil Nitin Mukesh is only present in the Hindi version.

The story revolves around the lives of three Davids in three different parts of the world in three different eras.

London, 1975: 30-year-old David (Neil Nitin Mukesh) works for Iqbal Ghani, a dreaded Mafia don who controls London's Muslim community through his illegal activities. David is Ghani's protege who is poised to take over the empire one day as Ghani's son is a spoilt, playful brat. David is in love with Ghani's ward, Noor and promises to marry her. Things take a turn when two undercover RAW agents come to London to expose Ghani's ties to religious extremists in India. While trying to take David down, the agents reveal to him that his mother was Ghani's mistress and might have killed his father to be with him. David's loyalty towards his master is tested even more when Noor is forcefully married off to Ghani's son to hide the fact he is gay even though she is pregnant with David's son. When the RAW agents finally manage to get close to Ghani, they assassinate not only him but David as well to keep their mission a secret from the British authorities.

Mumbai, 1999: 19-year-old David (Vinay Virmani / Jiiva) is an amateur guitarist born into a family of lower-middle class Christians. He is a happy go lucky teenager who dreams of becoming a professional musician and sending his sisters off to Dubai to pursue their dreams. Their father, Noel, a Protestant priest rallies the locals to do charity work for those in need. A Hindu fanatic politician, Malati Tai, finds out about this and makes it appear as if David's father is converting poor people to Christianity in return for money. She attacks David's colony with the help of gangsters and humiliates Noel by blackening his face in front of the media. Traumatised by this, the priest starts to lose his mind. An angry David is then easily persuaded by a political activist to assassinate Malati at a rally to seek vengeance. However, the plan is foiled when an unknown gunman fails to assassinate Malati and instead kills the police officer standing next to her.

Goa, 2010: 30-year-old David (Vikram) is an alcoholic fisherman living in the small fishing village of Betul in Goa. He falls in love with the deaf and mute Roma (Isha Sharvani) – the only hitch is that she is engaged to be married to his best friend Peter in 10 days. When he finds out Peter does not really love her but is only marrying her for her wealthy father's boat which he will receive as dowry, David is coaxed by his friend, Frenny to stop the wedding. However, David comes to realise that his intentions might not be sincere as both his mother and the priest who tries to help him stop the wedding become involved in separate accidents and are hospitalised. On the day of the wedding, David plans to profess his love for Roma until Peter reveals that he actually sincerely loves her and was only lying that he was marrying her for the dowry out of fear he would be teased. David decides not to stop the wedding.

Gradually, it is revealed that all three Davids are connected somehow in the turn of events. In 1999, the London David's son with Noor, Iqbal, comes to Mumbai to seek revenge for his father's murder from the two RAW agents. He kills one RAW agent who is retiring as a General. The police officer killed at Malati Tai's rally is actually the other RAW agent who Iqbal shoots down with intent. Witnessing the shooting makes the Mumbai David realise what he almost became had he succeeded in assassinating Malati. He then moves to Goa and becomes a priest.

In 2010, he is the priest that marries off Peter to Roma. Realising that the Goan David would have spoken out against the wedding, he praises the Goan David for not doing so after the ceremony.

Cast 

Vikram as David, the fisherman, Sakku Santa (Kirku Santa in Tamil)
Neil Nitin Mukesh as David, the gangster and Iqbal
Vinay Virmani as David, the guitarist
Jiiva as David, the guitarist in Tamil version
Tabu as Frenny
Monica Dogra as Noor
Lara Dutta as Neelam (Gayathri in Tamil version)
Isha Sharvani as Roma
Sheetal Menon as Susie
Nassar as Father Noel
Nishan as Peter
Prahlad Kakkar as Father Albert
Remo Fernandes (Special appearance in the song "Maria Pitache")
Calvin Manish as Musician
Rubi Chakravarti
Rohini Hattangadi as Malati Tai
Milind Soman as Muslim
John Vijay as Ranade Bhai
Saurabh Shukla as Fisherman David's father
Shweta Pandit as Alice
Satish Kaushik as David's neighbour
Anupama Kumar as Zainab
Akarsh Khurana as Ghani
Vinod Sherawat as RAW agent
Manish Jha as Priest
 Bharat Jha
Ajinkya Deo as RAW agent
Nikhil Chinapa as Boxer
Sarika (Special appearance in the song "Dama Dam Mast Qalandar")
Neil Bhoopalam as Jahanzeb

Production

Development 
Bejoy Nambiar announced in December 2011 that he would make a Hindi film titled David, a gangster-comedy, and signed on Vikram to play a protagonist in the film. The pair had previously worked together in Mani Ratnam's Raavan and Raavanan, in which Nambiar had been an assistant director. It was revealed that the film would simultaneously show tracks of three people named David: Vikram's story takes place in Goa, while the two other stories happen in Mumbai and London and that they occur at different periods. Three cinematographer, R. Rathnavelu, P. S. Vinod and Sanu Varghese were recruited to shoot the respective segments. Sanjeev Lamba of Reliance, the film's producer, noted that the film had undergone changes and would be made a bilingual in Hindi and Tamil.

Vivek Oberoi was also recruited to play a titular character in the film. However Oberoi opted out of the project after finding out that the film would be a bilingual, and the team considered Farhan Akhtar before replacing him with Neil Nitin Mukesh. Neil Nitin Mukesh was asked to sport a complete retro-gangster look, and grow a hefty moustache for his role in the film. Mukesh's portions in the film were shot in London. Canadian-Indian actor Vinay Virmani would play the third character called David in the film and Jiiva reprised his part in the Tamil version. The storyline involving Mukesh's character were scrapped from the Tamil version, which left it with only two people named David. In January 2012, the producers signed Tabu and Isha Sharvani to play lead female roles in the film, with reports that Isha would be paired opposite Vikram.

Filming 
Scenes involving Vikram were filmed in Hindi only and were the first out of the three segments and were canned in locations which were meant to show a Goan backdrop. The team thus shot scenes featuring Vikram and Isha Sharvani in Alleppey, Kerala in late February 2012, before moving to Kuttanad. Mangalore beach was designed to replicate the beaches of Goa and a song featuring Remo Fernandes was also shot in February. Ratnavelu revealed that scenes were also canned in Kapu, Karnataka disguising Goa and that Vikram finished his portions for the film by March 2012. Nishan, a Mumbai-based actor who had appeared in Malayalam language films, was also selected to play a role in the segment, while actress Rubi Chakravarti was also recruited to play Vikram's mother in the film after Bejoy Nambiar approached for a role written with her in mind. Prahlad Kakkar, a noted ad-maker, was convinced by Nambiar to make his debut in film by appearing in the role of a priest and consequently shot his scenes in Mangalore.

The scenes of the character playing a musician Vinay Virmani / Jiiva, was the second segment to be shot with Sejal Shah recruited as cinematographer. Lara Dutta plays an extended cameo role in both versions as a mother, whose child is tutored by Virmani / Jiiva character. Sheetal Menon, who appeared in Shaitan was also recruited to play a pivotal role in Vinay Virmani's and Jiiva's sequences. Singer Shweta Pandit also shot for the film in both languages making her debut as a musician, while Nassar was recruited to appear in both versions of the film. Manish Jha, director of the 2003 film Matrubhoomi, was signed on to act in another pivotal role in the third segment with Nambiar noting "he was physically perfect for the part". Actor-director Satish Kaushik also shot for this portion of the film, portraying one of David's neighbours.

Nambiar noted that Neil Nitin Mukesh's scenes were the most problematic to shoot as a result of the actor's involvement in his other film 3G being shot in Fiji and thus dates were difficult to accommodate Shilpi Shukla did great in the movie to. Akarsh Khurana, a theatre actor, who also helped write portions in the film, was also selected to play a major role and shot for scenes in Neil's portion. Monica Dogra was chosen to portray the female lead in this segment, being paired opposite Neil Nitin Mukesh. Anupama Kumar, who was previously seen in Ishqiya, was one of the few South actors to be recruited to act in the Hindi version; she would play a Pakistani woman of the 1970s which she termed as "very different and exciting". The scenes involving Neil's character would start in Canada and finish in Ooty and completed by the end of 2012. A five-day shooting was held at the City Hall of Belfast, Northern Ireland, UK in September 2012. The film was enticed to Northern Ireland on the back of a trip to India earlier this year by Enterprise Minister Arlene Foster. In a collaborative effort between Invest Northern Ireland and Northern Ireland Screen, Indian Production company Getaway Films has received £30,000 funding through the Northern Ireland Screen Fund supported by Invest NI and part funded by the European Regional Development Fund. The film was widely supported by the Northern Ireland Screen Initiative.

Marketing 
Bejoy Nambiar planned an innovative strategy to release the first look of the film on sites such as Twitter and YouTube.

Music 

The soundtrack of David consists of 15 tracks composed by eight various artists, including Prashant Pillai and Mikey McCleary, who had worked on Nambiar's Shaitan, too, and independent bands Bramfatura, Maatibaani and Modern Mafia. Tamil film composer Anirudh Ravichander of "Why This Kolaveri Di" fame, also contributed one song, making his Bollywood debut. 

The track "Kanave Kanave" which was released as the Tamil version of the film's first single on 7 December 2012, sung and composed by Anirudh Ravichander, became popular among its release, and listed on Top 10 Songs in major music charts. The full album of the Tamil version was released on 21 December 2012, at a launch event held at the renovated Rani Seethai Hall in Chennai, in attendance of the film cast and crew. The film's audio CD was launched at the event. 

The song "Yun Hi Re", which is the Hindi version of "Kanave Kanave" which is composed by Anirudh Ravichander was released as a single on 10 December 2012. A new version of the famous traditional Qawwali number "Dama Dam Mast Qalandar" was released on 17 December 2012.

Hindi

Tamil

Hindi version
Koimoi wrote that "Overall, album is like a roller coaster ride which does steer you in one direction and though there are bumps, it is still worth hopping on to". Radio Mirchi rated the album 4/5 and said that  "David's soundtrack has got everything to keep the listener hooked for a long time. The film is set in three different time periods, so the music explores three different eras and is very refreshing. Hard to sum up the verdict on David, it is truly blockbuster material". Firstpost wrote that "With a heady mix of rock, folk, qawwali and dubstep, David makes a great album, one that Bollywood has not seen in recent times. The soundtrack grows on the listener and is certainly a cut above the regular Bollywood song and dance routine".

Tamil version
IBNLive said that "the soundtrack boasts of trendsetting music". Behindwoods rated 3.5 stars out of 5 by saying "David isn't just a great soundtrack, it's destined to be a trend-setter." NDTV Movies, rated the soundtrack 3 out of 5, with the song "Kanave Kanave" as their pick of the album.

Reception

Critical reception 

Hindi version
Nicholas Rapold of The New York Times wrote that "Rather than being a star- or song-driven showcase (despite a notably eclectic soundtrack), “David” zigzags tonally and visually thanks to Mr. Nambiar, an eager student of flair". Sukanya Verma for Rediff.com has given 2.5 out of 5 stars for the movie and says "A shorter, snappier David with a little less rambling and randomness may have led to a better payoff. Still, there’s no denying Nambiar’s promise as an adventurous, aesthetically-sound filmmaker but his weak spot remains the same. His eye for dynamic visuals is yet to find its match in stories that speak." Shivesh Kumar of IndiaWeekly awarded the movie 2 out of 5 stars. NDTV gave 3 out of 5 stars, stating "With a run time of 155 minutes, David tends to be a tad flabby at times. In other words, its pace is anything but consistent." The Times of India, gave 3 out of 5 stars and described the movie as "Yes, the Devil's in the detail. But maybe David needed more 'D' of 'Depth' in the story to make this more 'Delightful'."

Tamil version
Kirthi Jeyakumar of Rediff.com gave 4 out of 5 stars, and stated "The characters themselves are realistic, and believable. Their emotional struggles and their reactions to the world around them are pictures painted with vibrant shades, rather than the disturbed and dark protagonist that one is wont to consider them to be. Thinking out of the box can sure get one ahead, and Nambiar has proved his prowess with elan." Subha J Rao of The Hindu stated "Watch if you love a film that is not packed with action. This one flows by languidly, chronicling inner journeys." A critic from The Times of India opined that "The movie might be about love, crucial decisions and situations that bring people together, but ‘David’ doesn’t conjure up enough magic!"

Box office 
The film opened to very positive response of 50% only and collected 50–60 lakh net on its first day.
The second showed a little growth of around 50% bringing up the 2-day total to 1.6 crore. On day 3, it collected another 1.05 crore and the total collection for the 1st weekend would be 2.57 crore net at the domestic box office. David had an average fourth day and collected 2.1 crore.

References

External links 
 
 

2010s Hindi-language films
2013 crime films
2013 films
Films directed by Bejoy Nambiar
Films scored by Mikey McCleary
Films set in 1975
Films set in 1999
Films set in 2010
Films set in Goa
Films set in London
Films set in Mumbai
Films shot in Alappuzha
Films shot in Karnataka
Films shot in London
Films shot in Mangalore
Films shot in Northern Ireland
Films shot in Ooty
Indian crime films
Reliance Entertainment films